Team Stölting was a UCI Professional Continental team founded in 2011 and based in Germany. It participates in UCI Continental Circuits races. In December 2016, the team announced they would fold at the end of the month, with principle sponsor Stolting expressing their desire not to drop down to UCI Continental level.

Roster
Roster in 2016:

 (from 1 August, trainee)

 (from 1 August, trainee)
 (from 1 August, trainee)

Major wins

2011
Arno Wallaard Memorial, Arne Hassink
2012
Stage 4 Internationale Thüringen-Rundfahrt U23, Jan Dieteren
2013
Prologue Istrian Spring Trophy, Luke Roberts
 National Under-23 Road Race Championships, Silvio Herklotz
Stage 2 Internationale Thüringen-Rundfahrt U23, Jan Dieteren
Overall Tour Alsace, Silvio Herklotz
Stage 5, Silvio Herklotz
Stage 1a Tour of Bulgaria, Phil Bauhaus
2014
GP Palio del Recioto, Silvio Herklotz
Skive-Løbet, Max Walscheid
Stages 4 & 5 Tour de Berlin, Max Walscheid
Overall Tour of Małopolska, Maximilian Werda
Stages 2 & 3, Maximilian Werda
 National Under-23 Road Race Championships, Max Walscheid
 National Under-23 Time Trial Championships, Nils Politt
Stages 1 & 6 Volta a Portugal, Phil Bauhaus
Stage 5 Baltic Chain Tour, Phil Bauhaus
Kernen Omloop Echt-Susteren, Phil Bauhaus
2015
 National Under-23 Time Trial Championships, Lennard Kamna

References

UCI Continental Teams (Europe)
Former UCI Professional Continental teams
Cycling teams based in Germany
Cycling teams established in 2011
Cycling teams disestablished in 2016